The fiery topaz (Topaza pyra) is a species of hummingbird in the family Trochilidae. It has brilliant iridescent plumage and resides in northern South America, where it consumes nectar and insects.

Taxonomy and systematics 
The genus Topaza and its sister genus Florisuga form the topazes group, which together with the hermits represent the most ancient branch within the family Trochilidae. The Topazes group contains some of the largest hummingbirds in the family, adult males measuring up to 23 cm and weighing up to 12 g. Topazes as a group are estimated to have diverged as a separate lineage from all other hummingbirds around 21.5 Ma, whereas the most recent common ancestor of Topaza and Florisuga lived approximately 19 Ma.

Two morphospecies are recognized within Topaza: T. pyra, and the crimson topaz, T. pella. The species status of T. pyra has been challenged by some authors, who consider this genus to be monotypic. Arguments for and against the distinction between the two have focused on the degree of similarity of the two taxa and their geographic distributions. While they are clearly closely related, proponents of T. pyra being its own species point to the obvious differences between the two taxa in coloration and morphometric characteristics of both sexes, differences which are consistent across their geographic ranges. Neither intermediate forms nor hybrids have been reported, and no specimens have been found that showed any combination of the characteristics of the two taxa. The Amazon River seems to have played a part in keeping the lineages distinct, inhibiting gene flow and promoting the speciation.

Subspecies include:

 Topaza pyra pyra – it occurs from southeastern Colombia to eastern Ecuador, northeastern Peru and southern Venezuela
 Topaza pyra amaruni – it occurs in the western parts of the Amazon in Peru and Ecuador (Napo River and Río Corrientes)
 Topaza pyra pamprepta – it occurs in eastern Ecuador (Napo River and Río Suno region)

Description

There is strong sexual dimorphism between the males and females. Both have a dark brown iris, but males are larger on average than females.

Males of these brilliantly marked hummingbirds have a back, lower breast, upperwing-coverts, and outer webs of the innermost two remiges that are shining orange-red, becoming more orange on the belly, shading over the rump into the yellow-green/green uppertail-coverts. The male's bill is black, and it has gray feet.

Females are shining green above, with a coppery red gorget bordered by a narrow orange-yellow-green band. The rest of the head is medium to bluish-green, with the breast less bluish. Tail is purplish red. Female bills are black like the male's, but their feet are orange/flesh colored. The upper and under-tail coverts have orange highlights in the males, as opposed to blue-green in the females, and are somewhat lengthened and loose-webbed.
This species is very similar to crimson topaz. Topaza pyra can be distinguished from the closely related Topaza pella by their shorter beaks, longer wings, longer tail, and thinner rectrices.

Distribution and habitat 
Topaz hummingbirds as a group are endemic to the Amazonian rainforest. This species has a very large range. T. pyra can be found in Brazil, Colombia, Ecuador, Peru and Venezuela. They are encountered high in the canopy and prefer the edges of forests and clearings near water, and are often seen close to river banks.

Behavior and ecology 
Little is known about the behavior of these birds, as there have been few observations made of them in the wild, but they have been observed feeding and interacting with one another over a rocky streams in the foothills of their territory. They are also known to nest in small lichen-covered cups low over the water, like other hummingbirds. The males are rather territorial, and usually ward off intruders around flowering areas.

Food and feeding
As with their behavior, more observational studies of these birds is needed. However, it is known that this species is mainly nectarivorous, and feeds at flowers, vines, and epiphytes from eye level to high in the canopy, preferring high flowering vines. They also feed on insects.

Status 
Topaza pyra is categorized as Least Concern, due to its broad range, but with a decreasing population. Population is unknown, but estimated to be greater than the threshold for Vulnerable classifications, and the rate of population decline is not thought to be rapid enough to classify as Vulnerable.

Bibliography
 George Robert Gray: A list of the genera of birds: with their synonyma an indication of the typical species of each genus. Compiled from various sources. Richard and John E. Taylor, London 1840.
 James A. Jobling: Helm Dictionary of Scientific Bird Names. Christopher Helm, London 2010, .
 Rolf Grantsau: Die Kolibris Brasiliens. Expressão e Cultura, Rio de Janeiro 1988, .
Robert Sterling Ridgely, Paul J. Greenfield: Birds of Ecuador Field Guide: Field Guide. Bd. 2, Princeton University Press, Princeton 2001, .
Stotz, D.F., Fitzpatrick, J.W., Parker, T.A. and Moskovits, D.K. 1996. Neotropical Birds: Ecology and Conservation. University of Chicago Press, Chicago.
D. S. Hu, L. Joseph, & D. Agro: Distribution, variation, and taxonomy of Topaza hummingbirds (Aves: Trochilidae). Ornitologia Neotropical. Neotropical Ornithological Society, 2000.
B. Davis & S. Olmstead: Aves, Apodiformes, Trochilidae, Topaza pella (Linnaeus, 1758): a range reinforcement in Amazonian Brazil. Check List. 2016.
D. Willard et al: The birds of Cerro de la Neblina, Territorio Federal Amazonas, Venezuela. Fieldiana, Zoology. Field Museum of Natural History, 1991.
Tobias Andermann, Alexandre M Fernandes, Urban Olsson, Mats Töpel, Bernard Pfeil, Bengt Oxelman, Alexandre Aleixo, Brant C Faircloth, Alexandre Antonelli. Allele Phasing Greatly Improves the Phylogenetic Utility of Ultraconserved Elements. Systematic Biology. The Society of Systematic Biologists, 2019.
A. Schmitz-Ornés, M. Haase: Adapting generalized frequency coding to use colour spectra in the determination of phylogenetic relationships: an example with hummingbirds. Journal of Zoological Systematics & Evolutionary Research. Wiley-Blackwell, 2009.
Mike & Seeholzer Harvey, Glenn & Cáceres A., Daniel & Winger, Benjamin & Tello, Jose & Hernandez, Flor & Aponte Justiniano, Miguel & Judy, Caroline & Ramirez, Sheila & Terrill, Ryan & Brown, Clare & León, Luis & Bravo, Gustavo & Combe, Mariela & Custodio, Omar & Zumaeta, Alessandra & Tello, Abraham & Garcia-Bravo, Antonio & Savit, Aaron & Barden, Olivier: The avian biogeography of an Amazonian headwater: The Upper Ucayali River, Peru. The Wilson Journal of Ornithology. The Wilson Ornithological Society, 2014.
Steven L. Hilty, Guy Tudor, John A. Gwynne: Birds of Venezuela. Princeton University Press, 2003.

References

fiery topaz
Birds of the Colombian Amazon
Birds of the Venezuelan Amazon
Birds of the Ecuadorian Amazon
Birds of the Peruvian Amazon
Birds of the Amazon Basin
fiery topaz
Taxonomy articles created by Polbot